is a former Japanese football player.

Playing career
Maekawa was born in Numazu on July 22, 1979. After graduating from Shimizu Commercial High School, he joined Japan Football League club Honda in 1998. He played many matches as goalkeeper in 2000. In 2001, he moved to J2 League club Vegalta Sendai. Although he played 1 match in Emperor's Cup, he could not play at all in J2 League behind Norio Takahashi. Although Vegalta was promoted to J1 League from 2002, he could not play at all in the match behind Takahashi and Kiyomitsu Kobari in 2002. In 2003, he moved to Japan Football League club Sony Sendai. He retired end of 2006 season.

Club statistics

References

External links
j-league

1979 births
Living people
Association football people from Shizuoka Prefecture
Japanese footballers
J1 League players
J2 League players
Japan Football League (1992–1998) players
Japan Football League players
Honda FC players
Vegalta Sendai players
Sony Sendai FC players
Association football goalkeepers